The Hungarian Olympic Committee (MOB) is the National Olympic Committee representing Hungary.

History

The Hungarian Olympic Committee was founded on 19 December 1895, as sixth in the world, following the French, Greek, American, German and Australian Olympic Committees.

List of presidents

Member federations
The Hungarian National Federations are the organizations that coordinate all aspects of their individual sports. They are responsible for training, competition and development of their sports. There are currently 33 Olympic Summer and five Winter Sport Federations in Hungary.

See also
Hungary at the Olympics

External links
 Official website

 
Hungary
Hungary at the Olympics
1895 establishments in Hungary
Sports organizations established in 1895